Eupogonius major is a species of beetle in the family Cerambycidae. It was described by Henry Walter Bates in 1885. It is known from Costa Rica, Guatemala, Mexico, and Honduras.

References

Eupogonius
Beetles described in 1885